Swarup Kumar Das is the Member of Legislative Assembly from Balasore Vidhan Sabha Constituency. He is a politician from Balasore, Odisha, India. He is a member of the Biju Janata Dal (BJD) political party.

In his first election Das won by over 13,000 votes defeating Manas Kumar Dutta.

References

External links 

 Odisha Legislative Assembly profile

Place of birth missing (living people)
Living people
Odisha politicians
Odisha MLAs 2019–2024
1970 births
People from Balasore district
Biju Janata Dal politicians